Mariusz Sawa (born 7 September 1975) is a Polish former football player.

Playing career
Sawa began his career at Gwardia Chełm. In the 1992–93 season, he achieved promotion to Ekstraklasa with Polonia Warsaw. Next season, he played 23 Ekstraklasa games and scored one goal, in a match against Siarka Tarnobrzeg in May 1994. He later played for Górnik Łęczna, Motor Lublin, Avia Świdnik, KS Lublinianka, Rovaniemen Palloseura, Polonia Przemyśl, Lewart Lubartów, and MG MZKS Kozienice.

Coaching career
In June 2010, Sawa was named manager of Wisła Puławy, winning promotion from the III liga in his first season, but in January 2012 his contract was terminated by mutual agreement. In May 2012, Sawa became manager of Motor Lublin, but he was sacked after six games of the 2012–13 season after a poor run of results. In 2013, he was hired to manage V liga club KS Dąbrowica.

In April 2014, he was appointed manager of Motor Lublin for the second time, and remained with the club until the end of the 2014–15 season. In January 2016, Sawa became head coach of III liga side JKS 1909 Jarosław. In the spring of 2018, he worked as coach for IV liga club Polonia Przemyśl.

On 29 June 2018, Sawa was appointed  manager of Motor Lublin for the third time in his coaching career. He was sacked as coach on 17 September 2018 after the team suffered a 5–3 away defeat to Hutnik Kraków two days earlier. His contract was terminated on 28 September 2018.

Managerial statistics

References

External links
 

1975 births
Polish footballers
Polish expatriate footballers
Polonia Warsaw players
Górnik Łęczna players
Motor Lublin players
Avia Świdnik players
KS Lublinianka players
Motor Lublin managers
MG MZKS Kozienice players
Rovaniemen Palloseura players
Ekstraklasa players
Veikkausliiga players
Expatriate footballers in Finland
Living people
Association football forwards
Polish football managers
People from Chełm